Mikhail Yefimovich Nikolayev (born 1937) is the first president of the Sakha Republic, serving from 1991 to January 2002. He was succeeded by Vyacheslav Shtyrov. He graduated from the Omsk State Veterinary Institute in 1961.

Biography
Mikhail Nikolaev was born on November 13, 1937, in Oktyomtsy of the Ordzhonikidze district (modern Khangalassky District) of the Yakut Autonomous Soviet Socialist Republic. His parents were Yefim Fyodorovich Nikolayev and Maria Mikhaylovna Nikolayeva (maiden name — Kozlova).

He began his career in 1961 after graduating from Omsk State Veterinary Institute as a veterinarian in the Zhigansky district. Then he switched to the Komsomol work: first secretary of the Zhigansky district Komsomol committee, head of the department of the Komsomol authority of the Yakutsk regional Komsomol committee, first secretary of the Yakutsk city committee of the Komsomol.

Member of the CPSU from 1963 until its ban in August 1991.

From 1969 to 1971 he studied at the Higher Party School at the Central Committee of the CPSU.

From 1975 to 1979 - Deputy Chairman of the Council of Ministers of YASSR.

From 1979 to 1985 - Minister of Agriculture of the Republic. This was the period when the republic came to the forefront of the Russian Federation in the production of agricultural products, and new and bold endeavours were undertaken in the meadow, seed production, and other areas.

From 1985 to 1989 - the Secretary of the Yakut Regional Committee of the CPSU, oversaw the issues of the agro-industrial complex.

In December 1989, he was elected Chairman of the Presidium of the Supreme Council of the YASSR.

In April 1990 he was elected Chairman of the Supreme Council of the Republic. Deputy of the Supreme Soviet of the Yakut Autonomous Soviet Socialist Republic IX – XI convocations and people's deputy of Yakutia of the XII convocation.

December 20, 1991, was elected the first President of Yakutia, receiving 76.7% of the vote. On January 16, 1992, M.E. Nikolayev simultaneously headed the government of the republic. On December 27, 1991, the Yakut-Sakha Soviet Socialist Republic was renamed the Republic of Sakha (Yakutia).

In 1996, re-elected for a second term, gaining 58.96% of the vote.

Member of the Federation Council of the first and second convocations. On January 28, 2002, he was appointed representative in the Council of Federation of the Federal Assembly of the Russian Federation from the Government of the Republic of Sakha (Yakutia). Elected Deputy Chairman of the Federation Council. In February 2007, the President of the Republic of Sakha (Yakutia), V.A. Shtyrov, re-appointed M.E. Nikolayev as a representative of the Government of the Republic of Sakha (Yakutia) to the Council of Federation. Member of the Committee of the Council of the Federation on Social Policy, member of the Commission of the Council of the Federation to monitor the activities of the Council of Federation

In December 2011, he was elected to the State Duma of the Federal Assembly of the Russian Federation of the VI convocation from United Russia. Member of the State Duma Committee on Regional Policy and the Problems of the North and the Far East.

By decision of the Head of the Republic Egor Borisov dated October 31, Mikhail Nikolaev was appointed as a State Counselor of the Republic of Sakha (Yakutia) in connection with the expiration of the powers of the deputy of the State Duma of the Federal Assembly of the Russian Federation.

He is also the head of several public organizations. President of the International Public Movement "Eastern Dimension", President of the National Public Committee "Russian Family".

Family
Mikhail Nikolaev is married to Dora Nikitichna Nikolaeva (maiden name - Sukharinova). They have 3 children, and grandchildren, great-grandchildren.

Awards
Order For Merit to the Fatherland 2nd class
Order For Merit to the Fatherland 3rd class
Order For Merit to the Fatherland 4th class
Order of the Red Banner of Labour
Order of Friendship of Peoples
Jubilee Medal "In Commemoration of the 100th Anniversary since the Birth of Vladimir Il'ich Lenin"
Medal "For Construction of the Baikal-Amur Railway"
Miner's Glory Medal

References

1937 births
Living people
Heads of the Sakha Republic
Sixth convocation members of the State Duma (Russian Federation)
Communist Party of the Soviet Union members
Omsk State Agrarian University alumni
Recipients of the Order "For Merit to the Fatherland", 2nd class
Recipients of the Order "For Merit to the Fatherland", 3rd class
Recipients of the Order of Friendship of Peoples
Members of the Federation Council of Russia (after 2000)